Brett Johnson (born 15 August 1985) is an English semi-professional footballer who played in the Football League for Northampton Town, AFC Wimbledon and Brentford. He was adept as a left-sided central defender or as a left back. He played under manager Terry Brown at Aldershot Town, AFC Wimbledon and Margate.

Career

Early years and Football League (2002–2009) 
A defender, Johnson began his career with Isthmian League club Ashford Town (Middlesex) and transferred to Conference club Aldershot Town on 6 February 2004. He was a part of the team which reached the Conference Premier play-off semi-finals at the end of the 2004–05 season and earned a move to League Two club Northampton Town on 1 July 2005. Johnson's time at Sixfields was hampered by persistent hamstring injuries and despite spells away on loan in non-League football to gain fitness, he managed just 13 appearances before his contract expired at the end of the 2006–07 season. He signed successive six-month contracts to remain with the club for the duration of the 2007–08 season and made something of a breakthrough, making 18 appearances.

By the time of his release in June 2008, Johnson had made just 31 appearances during three seasons with Northampton Town. He dropped back down to League Two to join Brentford, the club he supports, on a one-year contract in August 2008. He made just 12 appearances during an injury-hit season and was released in June 2009, but he did win a League Two promotion medal.

AFC Wimbledon and return to non-League football (2009–2017) 
In August 2009, Johnson dropped into the Conference Premier to join AFC Wimbledon. Despite suffering from further injuries, he was a part of the team which clinched promotion to the Football League for the first time in the club's history with victory in the 2011 Conference Premier play-off Final. Johnson made 23 appearances in the Dons' debut season in League Two, but he spent time away on loan at Conference Premier club Cambridge United and was released in June 2012, after having made 94 appearances and scored six goals during three seasons at Kingsmeadow.

On 1 August 2012, Johnson dropped back into non-League football to join Woking, where he remained for two seasons and won the 2013–14 Surrey Senior Cup. A three-season spell with Margate followed (which included victory in the 2015 Isthmian League Premier Division play-off Final to win promotion to the National League South) in which he captained the team, but a combined torn cruciate, meniscus, medial ligament and fractured fibia injury suffered in a collision with his own goalkeeper in February 2017 forced him to take a break from football.

Personal life 
Johnson is a Brentford supporter. In 2012, after returning to part-time football, he began studying to be a taxi driver. By May 2018, he was working as a self-employed taxi driver.

Career statistics

Honours
Brentford
 Football League Two: 2008–09

AFC Wimbledon
Conference Premier play-offs: 2011
Woking

 Surrey Senior Cup: 2013–14

Margate
Isthmian League Premier Division play-offs: 2015

References

External links

1985 births
Living people
Footballers from Hammersmith
English footballers
Ashford Town (Middlesex) F.C. players
Aldershot Town F.C. players
Northampton Town F.C. players
Ebbsfleet United F.C. players
Grays Athletic F.C. players
Brentford F.C. players
AFC Wimbledon players
Cambridge United F.C. players
Woking F.C. players
Margate F.C. players
English Football League players
National League (English football) players
Isthmian League players
Association football central defenders
Association football fullbacks